Bares für Rares, also known as Cash or Trash in English, is a German television series on Zweites Deutsches Fernsehen (ZDF) presented by Horst Lichter, produced since 2013. It was first aired on August 3, 2013, on ZDF's sister channel ZDFneo and includes 8 seasons with a total of more than 1000 episodes as of 2020.

The show, which was awarded the Goldene Kamera in 2018 and the Deutscher Fernsehpreis in 2019, is considered the most successful show in the ZDF afternoon program thanks to its good audience ratings. On weekdays, around 3 million people watch with a regular market share of around 25 percent, even for the repeats in the early evening program on ZDFneo, up to 1.5 million viewers can sometimes be found. In 2019, the show was viewed by 5.65 million people on average.

Concept 
In the show, selected applicants each present a curiosity, rarity or antique they have brought with them. Once they have received their expertise, they will have the opportunity on site to offer their exhibit to a changing five-person podium for sale and, ideally, to sell it to the highest bidder for „Bares“ ("cash").

Since July 2017, the station has occasionally been showing special evening editions with unusual exhibits in an extended setting, in which prominent providers also present and sell objects, sometimes for charitable purposes. In this format, there are seven dealers in the sales area.

Seasons
The show was first broadcast on ZDFneo. Further episodes were shown weekly on the fixed broadcasting slot on Sundays at 1:15 p.m. on ZDF. From May 18, 2015, the show received the weekday slot for the discontinued cooking show Topfgeldjäger.

Literature 
 Hannes Burkhardt, Charlotte Bühl-Gramer: Trödelshows im Fernsehen – Geschichte als Ware. In: Public History Weekly 4 (2016) 24. doi:10.1515/phw-2016-6424.
 Horst Lichter, Bernd Imgrund: Bares für Rares: Die spannendsten Geschichten, die interessantesten Objekte, die sensationellsten Gebote. Riva Verlag, 2020, .

International versions 
{| style="text-align:center;margin:1em auto;" class="wikitable" width="100%"
! Country !! Title !! Presenter !! Channel !! Air date !! End date
|-
| 
| Affaire conclue
| Sophie Davant
| France 2
| August 21, 2017
| present
|-
| 
| Cash or Trash - Chi offre di più?
| Paolo Conticini
| NOVE
| October 4, 2021
| present
|-
| 
| The Bidding Room
| Nigel Havers
| BBC One
| 2020
| 2020
|-
|
| :Cash or Trash
| Despina Miraraki
| Star Channel
| 2022
| present
|-
|  (Flanders)
| Cash or Trash
| Martien Meiland
| SBS 6
| October 23, 2019
| April 14, 2020
|-
|
| Bares für Rares Österreich
| Willi Gabalier
|ServusTV
|2020
|-
|
|Łowcy Skarbów. Kto da więcej
| Paweł Orleański
|TV4
|2022
| present
|

External links 

 Official website (in German)
 Bares für Rares on IMDb
 Bares für Rares on fernsehserien.de (in German)

References 

German television shows